Alau may refer to:
 Aliʻi nui Alau son of Mauiloa Aliʻi ʻaimoku of Maui & father of Kanunokokuheliʻi
 Alau, Nepal
 Australian street slang for an Alley-oop (basketball)
 Alau Ice Palace, a speed skating oval in Astana, Kazakhstan
 Alau or durian alau, regional names for Durio graveolens

See also
Alaus, a genus of click beetle